Badsville is a 2017 American-Canadian action drama film directed by April Mullen and starring Robert Knepper and Emilio Rivera.

Cast
Robert Knepper as Mr. Gavin
Tamara Duarte as Suzy
Emilio Rivera as Lucky Lou
Chelsea Rendon as Helen
John White as Martin
Rene Rosado as Georgie
Douglas Spain as Charlie
Corbin Timbrook as Chester
Paul James Jordan as Cutter
Shelby Janes as Bowling Alley Waitress
Octavio Pizano as Flaco
Saxon Trainor as Louise
Gregory Kasyan as Sammy
Kelly Cunningham as Theresa
Benjamin Barrett as Benny
David Phillips as Chuck
Kate Campbell as Sammy's Mom
Ian McLaren as Wink
Lucas James as Chad

Production
According to the Niagara Falls Review, Mullen expressed interest in directing the film after David Phillips showed her the script.
The film was shot in Southern California.

On November 3, 2016, it was announced that Epic Pictures acquired the distribution rights to Badsville.

Reception
Gary MacDonald of The Globe and Mail wrote "Badsvilles an ugly place, but the acting/directing chops in this indie film brighten it considerably".

Gary Goldstein of the Los Angeles Times said, "Forget the cheapo title, Badsville is a powerful, deeply felt crime drama about letting go of the past and getting out of Dodge - before it's too late".

References

External links

American action drama films
Canadian action drama films
English-language Canadian films
Films directed by April Mullen
2017 action drama films
2010s English-language films
2010s American films
2010s Canadian films